15 Inolvidables Vol. 2 is a compilation album released by Marco Antonio Solís on August 7, 2015. It reached the number 4 spot on the billboard Latin pop charts.

Track listing
All songs written and composed by Marco Antonio Solís.

References

2015 compilation albums
Marco Antonio Solís compilation albums